The Hendrick and Waldur Hendrickson Farm, on South Dakota Highway 28 near Lake Norden, South Dakota, was listed on the National Register of Historic Places in 1985.  It has also been known as the Henry Lehtola Farm.  the listing included six contributing buildings and a contributing structure.

The house existing in 1985 was the third on the property, built in 1895–1896.  Preceding residences where a dugout and a sod house which were demolished.  It is a one-and-a-half-story frame hall/parlor plan house.

The farm complex includes a sauna building with an attached chicken coop. This is covered in wood shingles and sits upon a stone foundation.

References

Farms in South Dakota
National Register of Historic Places in South Dakota
Hamlin County, South Dakota